Yinzhou may refer to the following locations：

Modern locations
Yinzhou District, Tieling (银州区), Liaoning, China
Yinzhou District, Ningbo (鄞州区), Zhejiang, China

Historical locations
Yinzhou (historical prefecture), a prefecture in modern Shaanxi, China between the 6th and 12th centuries